The Git Go - Live at the Village Vanguard is a live album by jazz pianist Mal Waldron recorded at the Village Vanguard and released on the Italian Soul Note label in 1987.

Reception
The Allmusic review by Scott Yanow awarded the album 4 stars stating "this advanced set has the feel of a high-quality jam session".

Track listing
All compositions by Mal Waldron
 "Status Seeking" — 20:19 
 "The Git Go" — 25:31 
Recorded at the Village Vanguard in New York City on September 16, 1986

Personnel
Mal Waldron — piano
Woody Shaw — trumpet
Charlie Rouse — tenor saxophone, flute
Reggie Workman — bass
Ed Blackwell — drums

References

1987 live albums
Mal Waldron albums
Black Saint/Soul Note live albums
Albums recorded at the Village Vanguard